Illia Ponomarenko (Ukrainian: Ілля Пономаренко) is a Ukrainian journalist, war reporter and defense analyst writing for The Kyiv Independent. In January 2023, given his prominent role in reporting from the conflict, he was described by Der Spiegel as "likely the best-known Ukrainian after President Volodymyr Zelenskyy".

Shortly after the invasion of Ukraine, Ponomarenko saw his Twitter following soar to over one million, as many sought on-the-ground information in the early days of the invasion; Der Spiegel wrote that "for people worldwide, he became the most important chronicler of the war during this period." Since then, he has been regularly cited in international media, as well as writing translated opinion pieces, such as for Norwegian Aftenposten.

Ponomarenko grew up in Volnovakha, and studied at the Mariupol State University. He has stated he was studying international relations in Mariupol when the city was occupied in 2014 by Russian-backed forces. He began reporting on the clashes for BBC Radio in this period. He previously wrote for Kyiv Post, but following the abrupt reformatting and temporary closure of Kyiv Post in November 2021, Ponomarenko was among the team of journalists who founded the Kyiv Independent.

References

Ukrainian journalists
Living people
Year of birth missing (living people)